William Moultrie Moore Jr (June 11, 1916 – November 23, 1998) was Suffragan Bishop of the Episcopal Diocese of North Carolina from 1967 to 1975 and Bishop of the Episcopal Diocese of Easton from 1975 to 1983.

Early life and education
Moore was born on June 11, 1916, in Mount Pleasant, South Carolina, the son of William Moultrie Moore and Jennie Verdie Edmonston. He attended Porter Military Academy in Charleston, South Carolina and later studied at College of Charleston from which he graduated with a Bachelor of Arts in 1937. He also graduated with a Bachelor of Sacred Theology from General Theological Seminary in 1941.

Ordained ministry
Moore was ordained deacon in June 1940 and priest in May 1941, the latter by Bishop Albert Sidney Thomas of South Carolina. Between 1940 and 1942, he served as minister-in-charge of various churches, including St Alban's Church in Kingstree, South Carolina, St Luke's Church in Andrews, South Carolina, St Stephen's Church in St. Stephen, South Carolina and a mission in Rhems, South Carolina. In 1942 he became rector of Epiphany Church in Leaksville, North Carolina and St Thomas' Church in Reidsville, North Carolina. Between 1944 and 1952 he served as rector of St Luke's Church in Salisbury, North Carolina and between 1952 and 1967 he was rector of St Martin's Church in Charlotte, North Carolina.

Bishop
Moore was elected Suffragan Bishop of North Carolina on February 1, 1967, during the annual convention of the diocese which took place in St Paul's Church, Winston-Salem, North Carolina.  He was consecrated on May 27, 1967, by Bishop Albert R. Stuart of Georgia, assisted by Bishop Thomas Fraser of North Carolina and Bishop Richard H. Baker emeritus of North Carolina. He was elected Bishop of Easton on November 1, 1975, on third ballot at a special Convention which took place in Trinity Cathedral, Easton, Maryland. He and served there until his retirement in 1983.

Family
In 1941, Moore married Florence Porcher and together had three daughters.

References 

1916 births
1998 deaths
Episcopal Church in North Carolina
20th-century Anglican bishops in the United States
People from Mount Pleasant, South Carolina
Religious leaders from South Carolina
College of Charleston alumni
General Theological Seminary alumni
Episcopal bishops of Easton
Episcopal bishops of North Carolina